The Registration of Births, Deaths and Marriages (Scotland) Act 1965, was an Act of the Parliament of the United Kingdom, which amended the existing legislation controlling the registration system of births, deaths and marriages in Scotland founded in 1855. The Act set out the roles, responsibilities and functions of the Registrar General for Scotland, and the ability of the Registrar-General to appoint other Registrars. The Act also provides for a yearly report to be published by the Registrar-General delineating annual trends in Scotland's population - including estimated population size, birth rates, death rates and migration rates to be presented to Scottish Ministers.

The Act has been substantially amended in many areas with succeeding legislation, such as the Local Government (Scotland) Act 1973, the Marriage (Scotland) Act 1977, the Adoption (Scotland) Act 1978, the British Nationality Act 1981 and the Scotland Act 1998. The Scotland Act transferred overall control of the Registrar General for Scotland and the General Register Office for Scotland from the Scottish Office to the Scottish Executive- the devolved government of Scotland. However many of the central functions of the General Register Office for Scotland continue to be governed by the Act.

See also
Demographics of Scotland
Scottish People
Politics of Scotland
General Register Office for Scotland

References

External links
General Register Office for Scotland
Official government source for Scottish genealogy

UK Legislation 

Text of the Act (with subsequent amendments)

1965 in law
1965 in Scotland
Acts of the Parliament of the United Kingdom concerning Scotland
Archives in Scotland
Death in Scotland
Demographics of Scotland
Scottish genealogy
Marriage, unions and partnerships in Scotland
Identity documents of the United Kingdom
United Kingdom Acts of Parliament 1965
Vital statistics (government records)